Giovanni Pretorius (1 January 1972 – 23 August 2021) was a South African Olympic boxer.

Biography
He represented his country in the welterweight division at the 1992 Summer Olympics. He lost his first bout against Sören Antman. 

Pretorious died on 23 August 2021, in Alberton, after contracting COVID-19. He was 49.

References

1972 births
2021 deaths
Transvaal people
White South African people
South African male boxers
Olympic boxers of South Africa
Boxers at the 1992 Summer Olympics
Welterweight boxers
Deaths from the COVID-19 pandemic in South Africa